Harrison Stebbins (June 8, 1820 – September 5, 1882) was a farmer, teacher, and politician.

Born in Westfield, Orleans County, Vermont, Stebbins went to the public schools and helped his family on the farm. He then went to Norwich University in Norwich, Vermont and taught school. In 1841, Stebbins and his wife Mary moved to Janesville, Rock County, Wisconsin Territory. He served as county surveyor.  In 1844, Stebbins and  his wife moved to the town of Porter, Rock County, Wisconsin Territory and settled on a farm. In 1867, Stebbins built a grist mill at the community of Stebbinsville, Wisconsin; the community was named in his honor. Stebbins served as Porter Town Clerk and as Chairman of the Porter Town Board. In 1853, Stebbins served in the Wisconsin State Assembly and was involved with the Republican and Whig Parties. During the American Civil War, Stebbins with recruiting in the town of Porter. Stebbins died at his home in Porter, Wisconsin.

Notes

External links

1820 births
1882 deaths
People from Orleans County, Vermont
People from Porter, Wisconsin
People of Wisconsin in the American Civil War
Norwich University alumni
Educators from Vermont
Farmers from Vermont
Farmers from Wisconsin
Wisconsin Whigs
19th-century American politicians
County officials in Wisconsin
Mayors of places in Wisconsin
19th-century American educators
Republican Party members of the Wisconsin State Assembly